Events from the year 1492 in France

Incumbents
 Monarch – Charles VIII

Events
 3 October – Henry VII despatches an English expedition to lay Siege of Boulogne
 3 November – The Peace of Étaples  is agreed between France and England. Charles VIII grants a number of concessions including a payment of £153,000 to Henry VII to withdraw his forces

Births
 Marguerite de Navarre, French-born Queen of Navarre (died 1549)
 Charles Orlando, Dauphin of France, prince (died 1495)
 Anne d'Alençon, nobleman (died 1562)

Deaths
 Antoine Busnois, composer (born 1430)

References

1490s in France